Çavundur may refer to:

Çavundur, Kastamonu 
Çavundur, Kurşunlu
Çavundur, Lice
Çavundur, Merzifon